The Trans-Anatolian Natural Gas Pipeline (TANAP;) is a natural gas pipeline in Turkey. It is the central part of the Southern Gas Corridor, which connects the giant Shah Deniz gas field in Azerbaijan to Europe through the South Caucasus Pipeline and the Trans Adriatic Pipeline. The pipeline has a strategic importance for both Azerbaijan and Turkey. It allows the first Azerbaijani gas exports to Europe, beyond Turkey. It also strengthens the role of Turkey as a regional energy hub.

The construction of the -long pipeline started in March 2015, and it was inaugurated in June 2018.

History

The project was announced on 17 November 2011 at the Third Black Sea Energy and Economic Forum in Istanbul.  On 26 December 2011, Turkey and Azerbaijan signed a memorandum of understanding establishing a consortium to build and operate the pipeline. At first, a film dedicated to TANAP project was demonstrated.  In the film, it was emphasized that TANAP is the signature of friendship and brotherhood  between Turkey and Azerbaijan to Anatolia.

In spring 2012, the process of conducting the technical-economic feasibility study was launched.  On 26 June 2012, President of Azerbaijan Ilham Aliyev and then Prime Minister of Turkey Recep Tayyip Erdoğan signed a binding intergovernmental agreement on the pipeline. Also, the agreement was signed by Azerbaijani Industry and Energy Minister Natig Aliyev and Turkish Minister of Energy and Natural Resources Taner Yildiz. The initial agreement on organizational issues between BOTAŞ and SOCAR was signed by Natig Aliyev and Taner Yildiz, SOCAR President Rovnag Abdullayev and BOTAŞ Deputy Director General Mehmet Konuk. The host country agreement was signed by Yildiz and Abdullayev. On March 17, 2015, both Erdoğan and Aliyev met with Giorgi Margvelashvili, President of Georgia, in the city of Kars in Eastern Turkey to formally lay the foundations for the pipeline and marking the work as started.

On 12 June 2018, the TANAP was inaugurated at the compressor-measuring station in Eskişehir.  The ceremony was attended by the Turkish president Erdoğan, the Azerbaijani president Aliyev, the Ukrainian president Petro Poroshenko, the Serbian president Aleksandar Vučić, and the Bulgarian prime minister Boyko Borisov, as also by the head of SOCAR Abdullayev, Turkish minister of energy and natural resources Berat Albayrak, and the chief executive officer of BP Bob Dudley.

On November 21, 2018, TANAP and the Trans-Adriatic Pipeline (TAP) were joined along the shores of the Maritsa River at the Turkish-Greek border. As a result of the joining of these two pipelines, Azerbaijani natural gas from the Shah Deniz-2 field is now transported to Italy via Azerbaijan, Georgia, Turkey, Greece, Albania, and the Adriatic Sea.

In 2022 the flow rate doubled from 6 to 12 bcma.

Description
The pipeline cost US$8.5 billion. $800 million of funding was approved by the International Bank for Reconstruction and Development.

Its capacity would be increased by adding parallel loops and compressor stations according to the increase of available supplies. The maximum height of the pipeline is 2,700 metres above mean sea level.

Route
The TANAP pipeline passes through 20 provinces of Turkey – Ardahan, Kars, Erzurum, Erzincan, Bayburt, Gümüşhane, Giresun , Sivas, Yozgat, Kırşehir , Kırıkkale, Ankara, Eskişehir, Bilecik, Kütahya, Bursa, Balıkesir, Çanakkale, Tekirdağ and Edirne. The pipeline will start from Sangachal terminal and in territory of Azerbaijan it will be the expansion of existing South Caucasus Pipeline (SCPx). From end point of SCPx which is in Erzurum it will be continued to Eskişehir where it will unload 6bcm of gas entitled to Turkish buyers. From Turkey-Greece border it will continue through Greece, Albania and will end in Italy. The exact route of the pipeline is not clear. However, it was announced that one branch from Turkey would go to Greece and the other to Bulgaria. It would be connected with Trans Adriatic Pipeline. The Turkish government said in March 2015 that a branch from Greece through North Macedonia and Serbia to Hungary was also under consideration.

Shareholders
The TANAP is operated by SOCAR. SGC holds 58% stake in the project. Turkey's pipeline operator BOTAŞ own 30%, while BP acquired 12% in the project on March 13, 2015.  TANAP is headquartered in Ankara, Turkey.

Initially, Azerbaijan had held an 80% stake, with Turkey owning the remainder. The Turkish stake was divided between the Turkish upstream company TPAO (15%) and the Turkish pipeline operator BOTAŞ (5%). The international companies from the Shah Deniz consortium (BP, Statoil and Total) had an option to take up to 29% in TANAP. However, only BP exercised this option in December 2013. The Turkish government decided then that only BOTAŞ will hold a stake (20%) in TANAP. The Turkish pipeline operator acquired an additional 10% in May 2014. SOCAR's initial plan was to retain 51% and operatorship of the project. Several private Turkish companies had been interested in the remaining 7%, but this did not materialize.

CEO of TANAP is Saltuk Düzyol, the former general manager of BOTAŞ.

Contractors
Bechtel - Front End Engineering Design (FEED) 
WorleyParsons - Engineering, Procurement, Construction Management (EPCM)
ABB -  SCADA/Telecommunications System Engineering, Procurement and Construction (EPC) Works 
 Yüksel inşaat - Construction, installation, personnel training, and testing 
Fernas Construction Company
Akkord Industry Construction Investment Corporation
Tekfen
SICIM  - SICIM is a Construction Company established in 1962 and offering all types of services related to the installation of pipelines and relevant ancillary facilities for the transmission and distribution of oil, gas and water on an international basis
Punj Lloyd
Limak Holding
Sapura Energy
Noksel Steel Pipe Co.

Subcontractors
Rouge Pipeline and Process Services LLC - Based in Dubai, ROUGE Pipeline & Process Services is broadly divided into 3 divisions – Pipeline Services, Process Services and Talent Solutions. With its strategic alliances and representative offices in GCC countries (KSA, Oman, Kuwait), Algeria, Russia, Azerbaijan, Turkey and India, ROUGE is a market leader providing specialist services to both Onshore & Offshore companies in the Oil & Gas Industry.

See also 

TAP
Nabucco pipeline
South Caucasus Pipeline
Baku–Tbilisi–Ceyhan pipeline
Energy in Georgia (country)

References

External links
 Trans-Anatolian Gas Pipeline on Global Energy Monitor

Natural gas pipelines in Turkey
Proposed pipelines in Asia
Buildings and structures under construction in Turkey
Natural gas pipelines in Azerbaijan
Natural gas pipelines in Georgia (country)
Proposed pipelines in Europe